Twenty Something is a 1994 Hong Kong film directed by Teddy Chan Tak-Sum. It is the sole Category III film in UFO's (United Filmmakers Organization) list of credits, and features a hit theme song "Wish" sung by Sandy Lam. Then newcomer Jordan Chan won Best Supporting Actor at the 14th Hong Kong Film Awards for his role in the film.

Cast and roles
 Jordan Chan – Bo
 Valerie Chow – Alice
 Moses Chan – Tom
 Karsin Bak - Pat
 Farini Cheung – Jennifer
 Selena Khoo – Sue

References

External links
 IMDb entry
Twenty Something at Hong Kong Cinemagic

Hong Kong romantic comedy-drama films
1994 films
Films directed by Teddy Chan
1990s Hong Kong films